Mou Xinsheng (born December 1943) is a Chinese politician who served as head of the General Administration of Customs from 2001 to 2008. He was a member of the 16th Central Committee of the Chinese Communist Party. He was a delegate to the 11th National People's Congress.

Biography
Mou was born in Fufeng County, Shaanxi, in December 1943. In 1963, he was accepted to the Northwest University of Politics and Law, majoring in law. 

One year after graduation from university, he was assigned to a  PLA affiliated farm. In May 1970, he became an official in the Tacheng Prefecture Public Security Office of Xinjiang Uygur Autonomous Region, and served until December 1973, when he was reassigned to the Beijing General Petrochemical Plant. He joined the Beijing Municipal Public Security Bureau in August 1974, and worked there until April 1980. He was despatched to the Ministry of Public Security in April 1980, becoming vice minister in March 1993. Two months later, he became an official in the State Council, and worked there for five years. He was promoted to head of the General Administration of Customs in March 2001, and held that office until March 2008. During his term in office, He handled the Lai Changxing Case. In March 2008, he took office as vice chairperson of the National People's Congress Financial and Economic Affairs Committee.

References

1943 births
Living people
People from Fufeng County
Northwest University of Politics and Law alumni
Central Party School of the Chinese Communist Party alumni
People's Republic of China politicians from Shaanxi
Chinese Communist Party politicians from Shaanxi
Delegates to the 11th National People's Congress
Members of the 16th Central Committee of the Chinese Communist Party